The Yorke Arms is a luxury events venue in Ramsgill, Nidderdale, in the Yorkshire Dales in northern England.

The building began life as a shooting lodge for the Yorke family.  In 1842 it was rebuilt as a small inn, and by 1924 it had acquired a reputation as an eating establishment.  From 2003 to 2019 the restaurant held one star in the Michelin Guide.  The Yorke Arms closed as a restaurant and hotel in 2020.

When it was still a restaurant the Yorke Arms featured in The Trip, a 2010 BBC comedy starring Steve Coogan and Rob Brydon as fictionalised versions of themselves doing a restaurant tour of northern England.

References

External links 
Yorke Arms website
Nidderdale
Hotels in North Yorkshire
Defunct hotels in England
Defunct restaurants in the United Kingdom
Michelin Guide starred restaurants in the United Kingdom